Walter Martin (26 September 1936 – 21 January 2020) was an Italian professional racing cyclist. He notably won the 1961 Milano–Torino and rode in five editions of the Giro d'Italia.

Major results

1958
 10th Giro di Romagna
1959
 3rd Giro dell'Emilia
 10th Giro di Lombardia
1960
 1st Stage 3 Tour de Suisse
1961
 1st Milano–Torino
 3rd Giro di Romagna
 5th Giro di Toscana
 7th Milan–San Remo
 9th Overall Roma–Napoli–Roma
1962
 2nd Giro dell'Emilia
 5th GP Alghero
1963
 2nd Giro del Lazio
 2nd GP Cemab
 3rd Road race, National Road Championships
 5th Giro dell'Emilia
 7th Giro di Romagna

Grand Tour general classification results timeline

References

External links
 

1936 births
2020 deaths
Italian male cyclists
Cyclists from Rome
Tour de Suisse stage winners